Kevon Harris may refer to:
 Kevon Harris (footballer)
 Kevon Harris (basketball)

See also
 Kevin Harris (disambiguation)